Dyscritothamnus is a genus of Mexican flowering plants in the daisy family.

 Species
 Dyscritothamnus filifolius B.L.Rob. - Guanajuato, Hidalgo 
 Dyscritothamnus mirandae Paray - Querétaro

References

Millerieae
Asteraceae genera
Endemic flora of Mexico